Hang Tuah Well is a 1.8-meter-deep water well, which is located in Kampung Duyong, Malacca, Malaysia. It was declared as a historical monument under the Antiquities Act on 29 September 1977. According to the folklore, it is believed that Hang Tuah dug the well himself for his own use.

See also
 List of tourist attractions in Malacca

References

Buildings and structures in Malacca City
Water wells in Melaka